Periciazine (INN), also known as pericyazine (BAN) or propericiazine, is a drug that belongs to the phenothiazine class of typical antipsychotics.

Periciazine is not approved for sale in the United States. It is commonly sold in Canada, Italy and Russia under the tradename Neuleptil and in United Kingdom and Australia under the tradename Neulactil.

Medical uses 
The primary uses of periciazine include in the short-term treatment of severe anxiety or tension and in the maintenance treatment of psychotic disorders such as schizophrenia. There is insufficient evidence to determine whether periciazine is more or less effective than other antipsychotics. A 2014 systematic review compared periciazine with typical antipsychotics for schizophrenia:

Periciazine has also been studied in the treatment of opioid dependence.

Adverse effects
Periciazine is a rather sedating and anticholinergic antipsychotic, and despite being classed with the typical antipsychotics, its risk of extrapyramidal side effects is comparatively low. It has a relatively high risk of causing hyperprolactinaemia and a moderate risk of causing weight gain and orthostatic hypotension.

Synthesis

The final step in the synthesis involves the alkylation of 3-(2-cyanophenothiazin-10-yl)propyl 4-methylbenzenesulfonate, CID:134990672 (1) with 4-Piperidinol [5382-16-1] (2) giving Periciazine (3).

References

External links 
 Neulactil - Summary of Product Characteristics from the electronic Medicines Compendium
  from the Therapeutic Goods Administration.
  from Health Canada.

Typical antipsychotics
Phenothiazines
4-Hydroxypiperidines
Conjugated nitriles